Ravan, or Ravana(n), is the prime antagonist in the ancient Hindu epic Ramayana.

Ravan, Raavan or Ravanan, may also refer to:

Film and TV
 Raavan (2022 film), Bengali action film
 Ra.One, a 2011 Hindi-language film
 Two Indian films simultaneously directed and produced by Mani Ratnam:
 Raavanan (2010 film), the Tamil version starring Vikram and Aishwarya Rai
 Raavan (2010 film), the Hindi version starring Abhishek Bachchan and Aishwarya Rai
 Raavan (soundtrack)
 Raavan (TV series), a 2006-2008 drama series
 Ravanan (2006 film), a 2006 Malayalam film starring Kalabhavan Mani
 Ravanan (1994 film), a 1994 Tamil film starring Mansoor Ali Khan
 Raavan (1984 film), Hindi film

Places
 Ravan, Busovača, a village in Bosnia and Herzegovina
 Ravan, Brod-Posavina County, on the D525 road, Croatia
 Ravan, Hamadan, a village in Iran
 Ravan, Kermanshah, a village in Iran
 Ravan (river), in Russia

Other uses
 Ravan (comics), a DC Comics character
 Raavan: Enemy of Aryavarta, a novel by Amish Tripathi
 Eliezer ben Nathan, or Ra'avan, 10th century  halakist and liturgical poet
 Ravan Press, a South African anti-apartheid publishing house
 OFK Ravan, a Bosnian football club

See also

 Ravenna (disambiguation)
 Rawan (disambiguation)